The Artist Collection is a compilation album by rapper Busta Rhymes released on October 12, 2004.

Track listing

References

Busta Rhymes albums
Albums produced by the Neptunes
Albums produced by Just Blaze
Albums produced by Nottz
Albums produced by DJ Scratch
Albums produced by Dr. Dre
Albums produced by Scott Storch
2004 compilation albums